Exit Wounds is the seventh studio album by the Wallflowers, their first in nine years since the release of Glad All Over (2012).  The album debuted No. 183 on the US Billboard 200.  On Billboard’s Top Album Sales chart it debuted at No. 3, making it the band’s highest-charting album yet.  It was released by New West Records on July 9, 2021.  Singer-songwriter Shelby Lynne's backing vocals are featured on four tracks. "Roots and Wings" was released as the first single on April 9, 2021.

Background
Although the album was written and finished before the COVID-19 pandemic, Jakob Dylan said he said he did not want to put it out during a time of such uncertainty and suffering. In speaking to Uproxx about the origins of the album he said "these songs are written before Covid, but we still had the dumpster fire of everything else that was happening before that." Dylan noted that while he does not consider it to be a political album, current events in the United States certainly had an impact on his writing. As he emphasized to Consequence of Sound, perseverance in spite of turbulent times is a major theme on the album. This theme is especially notable on the track "I'll Let You Down (But I Will Not Give You Up)", which uses a "wayward bus" as a metaphor for social upheaval in the United States, but features a hopeful chorus with Shelby Lynne singing harmony.

Reception
Exit Wounds received a score of 72 out of 100 from Metacritic, indicating "generally favorable reviews." Mojo gave it four out of five stars and called it Dylan's "best original work by some yards." In a mostly positive review, American Songwriter wrote that "the sound is leaner, a little less rough around the edges and solidly in sync as well." Rolling Stones review was mixed, giving the album three out of five stars, and writing that Dylan "can evoke an Americana-tinged Warren Zevon, gruff but tender, with the best songs featuring Shelby Lynne's empathetic vocals."

Musical style

Pitchfork assessed the album as a return to classic rock with no adjustments made to accommodate "contemporary fashion". The first song, "Maybe Your Heart's Not in It No More", gave an impression of "soulful Americana". Classic Rock magazine agreed, calling the song roots rock. Classic Rock praised the album for its variety of song genres including the pop rock of "Roots and Wings" and the "raucous rave-up" of "Who's That Man Walkin' Round My Garden". The four songs with vocals by Shelby Lynne were described as adding a country music influence, and the album's overall genre was a combination of Americana and rock-inflected power pop. PopMatters wrote that the album was not a blues album, but it carried the influence of blues throughout, in the manner of rock music by the Rolling Stones. Glide magazine classified the album as "guitar-forward" "solid pop" and rock.

Track listing

Personnel 

 Jakob Dylan - vocals, guitar
 Butch Walker - producer, recording engineer, guitar, keyboards, percussion, backing vocals
 Mark Stepro - drums
 Whynot Jansveld - bass, mastering engineer
 Aaron Embry - keyboards
 Val McCallum - guitar
 Shelby Lynne - vocals (tracks 1,5,6,7)
 Brian Griffin - drums (track 6)
 Todd Stopera - assistant engineer
 Chris Dugan - mix engineer
 Artwork and design: Rob Carmichael, SEEN
 Interior Photo: Paige Dylan

Charts

Singles

References 

2021 albums
New West Records albums
The Wallflowers albums